Austin FC is an American professional soccer team based in Austin, Texas, that competes in Major League Soccer (MLS).

This is a list of club records for Austin FC, which dates from their inaugural season in 2021 to present.

Club Records

Matches
 League Victory: 5–0 v FC Cincinnati, (February 26, 2022) 
 League Defeat: 0–4 @ San Jose Earthquakes, (October 20, 2021)
 MLS Cup Playoffs Victory: 2–1 @ FC Dallas, (October 23, 2022) 
 MLS Cup Playoffs Defeat: 0–3 @ LAFC, (October 30, 2022)
 CONCACAF Champions League Victory: 2–0 v Violette AC, (March 14, 2023) 
 CONCACAF Champions League Defeat: 0–3 @ Violette AC, (March 8, 2023)
 U.S. Open Cup Defeat: 1–2 @ San Antonio FC, (April 20, 2022)

Streaks

Winning runs
Longest winning run in all competitions: 4,  (30 June 2022 - 12 July 2022)
Longest league winning run : 4,  (10 April 2022 – 30 April 2022) & (30 June 2022 - 12 July 2022)
Most home wins in a row (all competitions): 4, (24 October 2021 - 6 March 2022)
Most away wins in a row (all competitions): 4, (18 June 2022 - 9 July 2022)
Most league home wins in a row: 4, (24 October 2021 – 6 March 2022)
Most league away wins in a row: 4, (18 June 2022 - 9 July 2022)

Unbeaten runs
Longest unbeaten run (all competitions): 7, (18 June 2022 - 16 July 2022)
Longest league unbeaten run: 7, (18 June 2022 - 16 July 2022)

Winless runs
Longest winless run (all competitions): 5, (29 August 2021 — 18 September 2021)
Longest league winless run: 5, (29 August 2021 — 18 September 2021)
Longest home winless run: 3, (7 July 2021 – 31 July 2021) and (29 August 2021 – 18 September 2021)
Longest away winless run: 16, (9 May 2021 – 2 April 2022)

Draws
Most draws in a row: 3, (30 May 2021 - 19 June 2021)

Losses
Most defeats in a row: 5, (29 August 2021 — 18 September 2021)
Most home defeats in a row: 3, (7 July 2021 – 31 July 2021) and (29 August 2021 – 18 September 2021)
Most away defeats in a row: 10, (23 June 2021 – 12 March 2022)

Seasonal

Most
Most goals scored in a season (all competitions): 70, (2022) 
Most league goals scored in a season: 65, (2022) 
Most goals conceded in a season: 57, (2022) 
Most league goals conceded in a season: 56, (2021) 
Most play-off goals scored in a season: 4, (2022) 
Most play-off goals conceded in a season: 6, (2022) 
Most points in a league season: 56, (2022) 
Most league wins in a season: 16, (2022) 
Most home league wins in a season: 8, (2022) 
Most away league wins in a season: 8, (2022) 
Most league draws in a season: 8, (2022) 
Most league defeats in a season: 21, (2021)

Fewest
Fewest league goals scored in a season: 35, (2021) 
Fewest goals scored in a season: 35, (2021) 
Fewest play-off goals scored in a season: 4, (2022) 
Fewest league goals conceded in a season: 49, (2022) 
Fewest play-off goals scored in a season: 4, (2022) 
Fewest play-off goals conceded in a season: 6, (2022) 
Fewest points in a league season: 31, (2021) 
Fewest league wins in a season: 9, (2021) 
Fewest league draws in a season: 4, (2021) 
Fewest league defeats in a season: 10, (2022)

Player Awards

CONCACAF Champions League Bext XI

MLS Best XI

MLS All Star Team

ATX Player of the Year

Player records
Youngest player: Owen Wolff, 16 years, 308 days (against Sporting Kansas City, November 3, 2021)
Oldest player: Matt Besler, 34 years, 205 days (against Vancouver Whitecaps FC, September 4, 2021)
Youngest goal scorer: Owen Wolff, 18 years, 72 days (against Real Salt Lake, March 11, 2023)
Oldest goal scorer: Maximiliano Urruti, 32 years, 31 days (against CF Montréal, March 3, 2023)

Most appearances 
Current players on the Austin roster are shown in bold.

Top goalscorers 
Current players on the Austin roster are shown in bold.

Most Assists 
Current players on the Austin roster are shown in bold.

Most shutouts 
Current players on the Austin roster are shown in bold.

Captaincy

Coaching records

List of seasons

Transfers
As per MLS rules and regulations; some transfer fees have been undisclosed and are not included in the tables below.

Highest transfer fees paid

References

Austin FC
Austin FC records and statistics
Austin FC